"Fråga stjärnorna" is a song written by CajsaStina Åkerström, and recorded by herself on her debut album Cajsa Stina Åkerström. It was also released as a single in the same year. The single peaked at number 12 on the Swedish Singles Chart.

Also tested for Svensktoppen, the song charted for nine weeks between 9 April-14 June 1994, peaking at second position.

Charts

References

1994 singles
1994 songs
Swedish songs
Swedish-language songs
CajsaStina Åkerström songs